Alfred Hardy may refer to:

 Alfred Hardy (dermatologist) (1811–1893), French dermatologist
 Alfred Hardy (architect) (1900–1965), Belgian contractor and autodidact architect
 Alfred Douglas Hardy (1870–1958), Australian amateur collector of freshwater algae specimens

See also
Alfred Gathorne-Hardy, British politician